The Tecovas Formation is a geological formation in Texas.

Vertebrate fauna

See also
 List of dinosaur-bearing rock formations

References

Carnian Stage
Triassic geology of Texas